Yugoslavs may also refer to:

 Citizens of former Yugoslavia, a European country that existed from 1918 to 1992 (and reduced until 2003)
 Yugoslavs (ethnic group), ethnic Yugoslavs, members of a particular pan-ethnic community in former Yugoslavia and its successor states
 Yugoslavs, or Yugoslavists, members of the Yugoslav movement, a political and cultural movement that advocated the creation of Yugoslavia
 Yugoslavs (Jugosloveni), as South Slavs
 Federal Party of Yugoslavs, former political party
 San Pedro Yugoslavs, former soccer team

See also
 Yugoslavs in Serbia
 Yugoslav (disambiguation)
 Yugoslavia (disambiguation)
 Ethnic groups in Yugoslavia